Dan Netzell (4 January 1913 – 11 November 2003) was a Swedish ski jumper and a world record holder for one year.

Ski jumping world record

References

Swedish male ski jumpers
1913 births
2003 deaths
Sportspeople from Stockholm